Garachiné Airport  is an airport serving the Pacific coastal town of Garachiné, in the Darién Province of Panama.

North approach and departure are over the water.

Airlines and destinations

See also

Transport in Panama
List of airports in Panama

References

External links
OpenStreetMap - Garachiné
OurAirports - Garachiné Airport
 Aerial view looking south
 Landing north

Airports in Panama
Buildings and structures in Darién Province